Chlorine monoxide is a chemical radical with the chemical formula ClO•. It plays an important role in the process of ozone depletion. In the stratosphere, chlorine atoms react with ozone molecules to form chlorine monoxide and oxygen.

Cl• + O3 → ClO• + O2

This reaction causes the depletion of the ozone layer. The resulting ClO• radicals can further react: 

 ClO• + O• → Cl• + O2 

regenerating the chlorine radical. In this way, the overall reaction for the decomposition of ozone is catalyzed by chlorine, as ultimately chlorine remains unchanged. The overall reaction is:

O• + O3 → 2 O2

This has been a significant impact of the use of CFCs on the upper stratosphere, however many countries have agreed to ban the use of CFCs. The nonreactive nature of CFCs allows them to pass into the stratosphere, where they undergo photo-dissociation to form Cl radicals. These then readily form chlorine monoxide, and this cycle can continue until two radicals react to form dichlorine monoxide, terminating the radical reaction. Because the concentration of CFCs in atmosphere is very low, the probability of a terminating reaction is exceedingly low, meaning each radical can decompose many thousands of molecules of ozone.

Even though the use of CFCs has been banned in many countries, CFCs can stay in the atmosphere for 50 to 500 years. This causes many chlorine radicals to be produced and hence a significant amount of ozone molecules are decomposed before the chlorine radicals are able to react with chlorine monoxide to form  dichlorine monoxide.

References 

Chlorine oxides
Free radicals